Here, Hear III. is an EP by La Dispute, self-released on December 25, 2009. Unlike the previous two EPs in the series, Here, Hear III. was recorded in Brad Vander Lugt's basement.

Release
With the release of this extended play, the first two EPs in the Here, Hear. series, as well as Untitled 7" and a two-track Christmas EP, became available for download on La Dispute's Bandcamp site. All purchases made during the three-week period from December 25, 2009, to January 17, 2010, were donated to the Well House Community Living of Grand Rapids, a non-profit outreach program in Grand Rapids that provides emergency shelter and permanent housing for homeless families. When the period of donation ended, $1,715 had been raised for Well House. All subsequent purchases from Bandcamp go towards covering the recording expenses of the band.

Track listing

Personnel
Jordan Dreyer - lead vocals, lyrics
Brad Vander Lugt - drums, keyboards, percussion
Chad Sterenberg - guitar
Kevin Whittemore - guitar
Adam Vass - bass, additional guitars

External links
  Download location of Here, Hear. III on Bandcamp
 Well House Community living of Grand Rapids Charity Site

References

2010 EPs
La Dispute (band) EPs